is a district located in Tochigi Prefecture, Japan.

As of 2011, the district has an estimated population of 66,852 and a density of 169 persons per km2. The total area is 396,72 km2.

Towns and villages 

Haga
Ichikai
Mashiko
Motegi

Merger
On March 23, 2009, the town of Ninomiya was merged into the city of Mōka.

References

Districts in Tochigi Prefecture